The 2018 Seoul mayoral election was held on 13 June 2018 as part of the 7th local elections. Incumbent Park Won-soon was elected for his third consecutive term; the South Korean Public Election Act places a limit of three consecutive terms on holders of the post, so that Park will not be able to run in the next mayoral election.

Selection of candidates

Democratic Party of Korea

Liberty Korea Party

Bareunmirae Party

Justice Party

Final candidates

Results

Summary

By districts

References 

Seoul mayoral elections
June 2018 events in South Korea
2018 in South Korea